Sean Chen (born August 27, 1988) is an American pianist. He won the 2013 American Pianists Awards and the third prize at the Van Cliburn International Piano Competition in 2013 and currently serves as an Artist-in-Residence at the University of Missouri–Kansas City Conservatory.

References 

1988 births
Living people
American male pianists
21st-century American pianists
21st-century American male musicians